"History" is a song by the English rock band the Verve. It was released on their second album, A Northern Soul. It was released 18 September 1995 as the third and final single from the album, charting at #24 in the UK Singles Chart. The song is notable for being released after the band's sudden first break up (the sign on the CD1 cover reads 'all farewells should be sudden'). In 2014, NME ranked it at number 312 on their list of The 500 Greatest Songs of All Time.

Composition and lyrics
The song begins with a string intro that is very similar to the intro of "Mind Games" by John Lennon. This was the first song by the band to feature strings (a formula that would later be used for several Urban Hymns singles). The opening lyrics of the song are based on the first two stanzas of William Blake's poem, London. The song is quite melancholic, with Melody Maker describing it as "an epic, windswept symphony of strings, flailing vocals and staggeringly bitter sentiments". It has been claimed the song was written about Ashcroft's split with his girlfriend, although Ashcroft denied this.

The clapping featured on "History" was believed to be performed by Liam Gallagher.

There was no original music video filmed for the single, probably because the band had already split when the single was released. Instead an official compilation of clips from The Verve's previous music videos was created by Ashcroft.

Track listings

 CD 1 HUTCD 59
"History" (Radio Edit)
"Back on My Feet Again"
"On Your Own" (Acoustic)
"Monkey Magic" (Brainstorm Mix)

 CD 2 HUTDX 59
"History" (Album Version)
"Grey Skies"
"Life's Not a Rehearsal"

 Cassette HUTC 59
"History" (Radio Edit)
"Back on My Feet Again"

 Promo CD HUTCDP 59
"History" (Radio Edit)

References

External links
 Official discography webpage

History
1995 songs
Hut Records singles
Songs written by Nick McCabe
Songs written by Richard Ashcroft
Songs written by Simon Jones (musician)
Songs written by Peter Salisbury